Madgen is a surname. Notable people with the surname include:

Ben Madgen (born 1985), Australian basketball player
Tess Madgen (born 1990), Australian basketball player